Sri Sacchidananda Shivabhinava Narasimha Bharathi Mahaswamiji (born as Shivaswami; 11 March 1858 – 1912) was the head of the Sringeri Sharada Peetham from 1879 to 1912. He is said to have played a significant role in the construction of the Sringeri Complex in Chikkamagaluru.

References

Sringeri Sharada Peetham
Advaitin philosophers
1858 births
1912 deaths